Al's Formal Wear is a chain of tuxedo rental stores that was founded by A. Haller, The business known as A. Haller Taylor shop on 311 Main street in Fort Worth, Texas in 1950. A Haller died late in 1950 and due to the community law, the company passed to his spouse, Yetta Haller. A. Haller and Yetta Haller had three daughters, each of whom received one-third of the business.  Al Sankary and Son Jerry H. Sankary flew to Los Angeles to enlist the firm of Sankary, Altshuler and Sachs. Joel Sachs was an attorney who specialized in Trust and Estates and was charged with the task of determining what family member owned what percentage of the business.

After A. Haller died in 1950, there were disputes as to ownership and division of the entity, now known as Al's Formal Wearin Fort Worth. It has since expanded across many states, and is currently headquartered in Houston . Over the years, Sankary manipulated his way into purchasing portions of the company from Esther, Betty, and Lillian. Sankary continued to experiment with different concepts, including bridal stores, mall kiosks, manufacturing formal lines himself, uniform sourcing for the militarcleaning. He believed strongly in vertical integration; from manufacturing formal wear to retail renting to cleaning and then back on the rack.

In 1957, Sankary brought in his sister, Lillian and her husband, Alan Gaylor, into the business. Since that time it has grown to over 100 locations in Texas, Louisiana, Arkansas, Colorado, Mississippi and Oklahoma . Today Al's Formal Wear is a family-owned business, with Alan Gaylor's son Stuart as company president.

The company stocks over 50 styles of tuxedos for rental, including designer names such as Ralph Lauren and Calvin Klein. The company also carries a wide variety of formal wear and accessories for retail purchase, as well as career apparel for occupations needing formal dress.

Al's Formal Wear fills orders for weddings, high school proms, quinceaneras and other events from its distribution centers.

Alan Gaylor and Al Sankary divided the business in 1978, with Gaylor maintaining ownership of the Al's Formal Wear operations based in Houston, while Sankary owned the operations based in the Dallas area. This division occasionally led to some customer confusion, but persisted until 1999, when Gaylor's Al's Formal Wear of Houston bought the Dallas operation from Sankary. At this point, the combined business included approximately 120 Al's Formal Wear, Ascot Tuxedos, and BridesMart locations in Texas, Louisiana, Oklahoma, and New Mexico. By 2006, some consolidation and the spin off of the bridal division reduced the number of tuxedo stores to between 90 and 100. After the purchase of Mr. Neat's Formalwear of Colorado, and an expansion into Arkansas and Mississippi, Al's Formal Wear now encompasses six states with over 100 stores .

References

 
 
 
 Houston Business Journal, (2000). "Top 50 Family Owned Businesses"
 Van Camp, Emily, (2005). "The family business: Al's Formal Wear rises to the occasion with its family of formal wear stores." US Business Review 6.2, p. 284.

External links
Al's Formal Wear corporate website

Companies based in Houston
Clothing retailers of the United States